Leon Šantelj (born April 25, 1995) is a Slovenian professional basketball player for Zadar of the ABA League and the Croatian League. He is a 2.05 m tall Power forward.

Professional career 
Šantelj began the 2020-21 season with BK Olomoucko of the Czech National Basketball League, averaging 9.0 points and 4.3 rebounds per game in six games. On November 1, 2020, he signed with Rogaška.

On 21 July 2022, Šantelj signed a one-year contract with Croatian club Zadar of the ABA League.

National team career
Šantelj made his debut for the Slovenian national team on February 22, 2019, at the 2019 FIBA Basketball World Cup qualification game against Turkey national team.

References

External links
 Eurobasket.com profile
 REALGM profile
 PROBALLERS profile

1995 births
Living people
Slovenian men's basketball players
Power forwards (basketball)
People from Postojna
KK Zadar players
Helios Suns players